Lennart Christensen (6 February 1933 – 18 December 1982) was a Danish sports shooter. He competed in the 25 metre pistol event at the 1972 Summer Olympics.

References

1933 births
1982 deaths
Danish male sport shooters
Olympic shooters of Denmark
Shooters at the 1972 Summer Olympics
Sportspeople from Copenhagen